Granice is a village situated in the Mladenovac municipality of Serbia.

References

Suburbs of Belgrade